Among the Ket people of Siberia, Tomam was the goddess of migratory birds. She is associated with the south, warmth, and the northern migration of birds that accompanies the warmer months.  In the autumn southward migrating birds are considered to be returning to "Mother Tomam".

References

See also 
 Khosedam

Siberian deities